"New Day" is a song by American hip hop recording artist 50 Cent. The song was released on July 27, 2012, originally as a single from his scrapped album Street King Immortal, but it was eventually removed from the project. The song was produced by Dr. Dre and mixed by Eminem, while co-written by the two along with 50 Cent, Alicia Keys, Royce da 5'9", Swizz Beatz, Andrew Brissett, Amber Streeter from RichGirl and Lawrence Jr from Aftermath Records. The song features a verse from Dr. Dre, while the hook is sung by Alicia Keys. Keys also recorded and released her own version of "New Day" which is featured on her fifth album Girl on Fire (2012).

The song first charted on the week of August 6, 2012 debuting at #79 on the Billboard Hot 100. The song fell outside of the top 100 during its second week. It also debuted at #66 on Billboard Hot R&B/Hip-Hop Songs and managed to climb to number 43, and at #28 on Digital Songs. Internationally, the song, charted at #43 on Canadian Hot 100, and at #52 on Japan Hot 100.

Background
On July 17, 2012, the single was announced during an interview with Digital Spy, with the cover art being unveiled that same day. The single was premiered with DJ Camilo on New York City radio station Hot 97 on July 27, 2012, and then later on Thisis50. The song later was released on iTunes for purchase as digital single on July 30, 2012.

On June 28, Swizz Beatz had leaked the solo version of his wife Alicia Keys' "New Day" on the internet. Later on August 8, 2012, in an interview with XXL, 50 Cent said the single was originally produced for Dr. Dre's album, Detox. They changed the chorus, sending it to Alicia Keys. She later sent it back with the new name, making them change additional strings on it. 50 Cent also revealed that Alicia recorded additional verses for it and leaked the record. Her solo version appears on her fifth studio album Girl on Fire (2012).

In a video uploaded via his YouTube account, 50 Cent also talked about the origins of the song, first meant to be This Life Won't Last Forever. The song's original chorus was vocally recorded and written by Ester Dean. It was sent to Alicia Keys, and then she sent it back with the "New Day" concept. He also said that Dr. Dre wanted the record to "feel like a movie".

On June 4, 2014, 50 Cent confirmed in an interview that all previous singles released on Interscope that were intended for the album, including "New Day", were scrapped and would not appear on the final track listing.

A Bronx Tale sample

The song contains an eight-second-long spoken-word introduction, indicative of and related to the content of the subsequent music. It an excerpt taken from the highly acclaimed 1993 gangster film, A Bronx Tale. The speaker's voice is that of Robert De Niro, who in the film, plays the role of Lorenzo Anello.

Music video
On August 17, 2012, 50 Cent released the official lyric video for the song via the site Rap Genius, where he also explained the lyrics of it. The lyric video featured scenes from others clips by him and Dr. Dre. It also features scenes from New York City such as Times Square. No official music video confirmed yet. Another lyric video was uploaded to 50 Cent's YouTube channel on August 24, 2012.

In an interview with Hot 97's Angie Martinez, 50 Cent spoke on several topics including the death of his manager, Chris Lighty as well as "New Day"'s conception and its accompanying music video that was supposed to begin filming in September 2012:

The song and video has received over 14 million views on YouTube.

Live performances
50 Cent performed the song in Dubai at Atelier Live Music Festival, with Tony Yayo, Kidd Kidd, Precious Paris and DJ Whoo Kid.

Track listing
Digital download
"New Day"  - 4:24

Credits and personnel 
Credits adapted from Billboard chart listing.
Songwriter – Curtis Jackson, Andre Young, Kasseem Dean, Alicia Keys, Ryan D. Montgomery, Marshall Mathers, T. Lawrence Jr, Andrew Brissett, Amber Streeter
Production – Dr. Dre
Mixing – Eminem

Charts

Radio and release history

References

2012 singles
50 Cent songs
Dr. Dre songs
Alicia Keys songs
Songs written by 50 Cent
Songs written by Dr. Dre
Songs written by Alicia Keys
Songs written by Eminem
Songs written by Swizz Beatz
Songs written by Royce da 5'9"
Song recordings produced by Dr. Dre
Song recordings produced by Swizz Beatz
Shady Records singles
Aftermath Entertainment singles
Interscope Records singles
Songs written by Sevyn Streeter
2012 songs